Bethel Cemetery is a historic cemetery at the end of Bethel Road in rural eastern Ashley County, Arkansas. The oldest marked burial is dated 1855, and it continues to receive new burials. It contains funerary markers carved by makers from an unusually wide geographic area, extending from New Orleans to St. Louis.

The cemetery was listed on the National Register of Historic Places in 2017.

See also
 National Register of Historic Places listings in Ashley County, Arkansas

References

External links
 

Cemeteries on the National Register of Historic Places in Arkansas
National Register of Historic Places in Ashley County, Arkansas
1855 establishments in Arkansas
Cultural infrastructure completed in 1855
Cemeteries established in the 1850s